Nerada is a rural locality in the Cassowary Coast Region, Queensland, Australia.

History 
The locality takes its name from its former railway station. It is believed to be an Aboriginal word from the Mamoo language meaning grass country.

In May 1936 the Queensland Government decided to construct a school at Nerada. Nerada State School opened on 11 February 1937. It closed in 1945. It was located at approximately 334 Nerada Road. About 1951 the school building was relocated to Woopen Creek State School.

In 1958 Dr Allan Maruff started the first commercial tea plantings in Australia since 1886 in the Nerada valley, south of Cairns, Queensland, using seedlings from the former Cutten brothers plantation at Bingil Bay. In 1969 Tea Estates of Australia (TEA) commenced tea planting adjacent to the Nerada plantation. In 1971 Nerada Tea Estates (NTE) opened Australia's first commercial tea factory. In 1973 TEA purchased NTE, ceased selling bulk tea and marketed the tea under the Nerada brand.

References 

Cassowary Coast Region
Localities in Queensland